The Laz people in Germany (German: Lasen in Deutschland, Laz: ლაზეფე ჯერმანჲაშე Lazepe Cermanyaşe) refers to an indigenous Kartvelian-speaking ethnic group inhabiting the Black Sea coastal regions of Turkey and Georgia. There are about 1,000 Laz in Germany.

History 
The earliest recorded Laz immigrants had come to Germany from Republic of Turkey in the 1970s, as a result of a labour recruitment agreement signed between West Germany and Republic of Turkey. Lazs in Germany are mostly Turkish nationals or naturalized citizens, however within the last decade more and more intellectual Laz people realized that the disappearance of their language would lead to the disappearance of their identity and tried to preserve their inherited culture through political empowerment, linguistic education, and music and poetry.

Lazs in Germany could be said to have pioneered the Laz language movement. The Lazuri Alboni (Laz Alphabet) based on the Latin alphabet was developed by Fahri Lazoğlu and Wolfgang Feurstein in Germany in 1984. Lazebura, which is the name of a magazine and now a website, published this alphabet for Laz people who live in Germany. Currently, the written language has two alphabets: the Mkhedruli (Georgian) alphabet for Laz community who inhabit in Georgia, and the Latin alphabet for Laz community who inhabit Turkey.

Laz culture movement the "Lazebura Foundation" was founded in Germany in 1997, which has petitioned the Turkish government to provide education of the Laz language in schools in northwestern Turkey, and to set up a language institute.

References 

Ethnic groups in Germany
Laz people